C. A. Rotwang is a fictional character in Fritz Lang's 1927 science fiction film Metropolis, as well as screenwriter Thea von Harbou's original novel Metropolis. In the film, Rotwang was played by Rudolf Klein-Rogge.

Character overview 
Rotwang is a brilliant scientist and inventor, whose greatest achievement is the creation of a robot made in the form of a woman (the Maschinenmensch, or Machine-Person). Originally, he intends to make a replacement for his lost love, Hel. Hel was a beautiful woman who eventually chose Joh Fredersen, master of the city and Rotwang's rival, instead of him. She later died while giving birth to Fredersen's son, Freder. Rotwang uses the robot to get revenge against Fredersen and Freder, while pretending that he is using the robot for Fredersen's benefit, and under Fredersen's instructions.

Rotwang lives in a strange old house in the middle of Metropolis; its rough exterior design contrasts sharply with the futuristic elegance of the city. In its basement is a trap door that leads down into a network of catacombs, where Rotwang and Fredersen eavesdrop on a secret meeting of the workers and Maria, their spiritual counselor. He lost a hand while developing the Machine-Person and now wears a fully functioning metal prosthesis in its place, covered by a black glove.

On Fredersen's orders, Rotwang abducts Maria, transfers her appearance to the robot, and releases the duplicate to incite a rebellion among the workers. However, the robot is programmed to obey only Rotwang, who secretly instructs it to cause destructive lust among the wealthy elite of Metropolis as well in a plot to ruin Fredersen. During the ensuing riots and power blackout, Rotwang falls under the delusion that the real Maria is Hel and chases her to the roof of the city's cathedral, with Freder in pursuit. The two men fight on the roof, and Rotwang falls to his death.

Name 
The name "Rotwang" is derived from a series of German words. "Rot" is German for red, "Wang(e)" for cheek, "rotwangig" for rosy-cheeked. "Rotwang" therefore means "red-cheek" or "rosy-cheek".

Cultural influence 
Rotwang was very influential in the iconography of the mad scientist archetype. His laboratory, with its profusion of Tesla coils and towering switch panels, baroque chemical equipment and pipework, became a stock feature of many later films, including many in the Frankenstein series. Like Victor Frankenstein, he attempts to "play God" by creating life, only to be defeated and destroyed in the end.

Many aspects of Rotwang's appearance and character, particularly the black-gloved "mechanical" hand, turn up in the title character of Dr. Strangelove.

Other appearances 
Rotwang (along with Maria, his robot) appears as a member of The Twilight Heroes, a German analogue to The League of Extraordinary Gentlemen, in the graphic novel The League of Extraordinary Gentlemen: Black Dossier.

Rotwang also appears as part of the German forces attempting to create the Red Baron, along with silent film characters Doctor Mabuse, Doctor Caligari and Count Orlok, in Kim Newman's alternate history novel The Bloody Red Baron.

Rotwang existed at some point in the DC Universe, where his robot creation became the time traveling villainess Mekanique. Mekanique claims to have traveled to the era of the All-Star Squadron to alter history for her master, and that she succeeded; whether this is true is unknown. Rotwang himself did not appear in the comic.

In the novel Superman's Metropolis, Lex Luthor is cast in Rotwang's role.

In Osamu Tezuka's Metropolis manga and the later anime film based upon it, Rotwang is replaced by a character named Laughton (though their names are pronounced similarly in Japanese). 
 
In the Yugoslav comic book series Borba, Rotwang is a recurring villain, and is portrayed as a Nazi.

In Before Tomorrowland, a prequel novel to Tomorrowland, there is a villain named Werner Rotwang. Presented as the namesake of Fritz Lang's character, he is an unethical roboticist who defects from the Plus Ultra organization and joins the Nazis to further his research into achieving immortality through robotics.

In the first series of Hergès Jo, Zette and Jocko adventures: "The Secret Ray", an unnamed scientist unsuccessfully experiments with transferring a human soul into a robots body.

In Jeffrey Thomas's story "Precious Metal", the character Maria Rotwang kills a gang that has previously killed members of a robot jazz band.

References

Fictional mad scientists
Fictional amputees
Science fiction film characters
Literary characters introduced in 1927
Fictional roboticists
Fictional scientists in films
Characters in German novels of the 20th century
America's Best Comics characters
Metropolis (1927 film)
Male film villains
Male literary villains
Male characters in literature
Male characters in film